Sixto Valencia Burgos (March 28, 1934 – April 23, 2015) was a Mexican cartoon artist based in Mexico City, best known for taking over the responsibility of drawing famed Mexican cartoon character Memín Pinguín. This cartoon was very criticized by the USA media as it was considered racist because Memin, the main character, was drawn with a very gross black racist stereotype.

Valencia was born in Tezontepec, Hidalgo, Mexico in 1934. He started sketching characters at age 11, when he and his family moved to Mexico City. Valencia started working as a caricature artist early and never went to high school.

In 1963, Valencia began drawing the best-selling Memín Pinguín, a black & white comic book that sold 700,000 copies by 1977.

Between 1992 and 1993, Valencia was the editor of the Spanish version of Mad magazine.

Valencia had been the president of SOMEHI (Syndicate of Mexican comic book artists) since 1998.

External links
Bio from amiens.com
Cartoonist defends stereotyped image on new Mexican stamps

1934 births
2015 deaths
Mexican male writers
People from Hidalgo (state)
Writers from Mexico City